The Style Counsellors is an Irish style and beauty makeover series that first aired on RTÉ One on 7 January 2020. Series one consisted of six episodes and was presented by Suzanne Jackson and Eileen Smith. Series two started airing in January 2021.

References

External links
 The Style Counsellors at RTE

2020 Irish television series debuts
Irish reality television series
2020s Irish television series